Zaddick Longenbach (born October 27, 1971) is an American fencer. He competed in the individual foil event at the 1992 Summer Olympics. He later became an art collector.

References

External links
 

1971 births
Living people
American male foil fencers
Olympic fencers of the United States
Fencers at the 1992 Summer Olympics
Sportspeople from Pennsylvania
Pan American Games medalists in fencing
Pan American Games silver medalists for the United States
Pan American Games bronze medalists for the United States
Fencers at the 1999 Pan American Games
Medalists at the 1999 Pan American Games